The 2003–04 season was Villarreal Club de Fútbol's 81st season in existence and the club's 4th consecutive season in the top flight of Spanish football. In addition to the domestic league, Villarreal participated in this season's editions of the Copa del Rey and the UEFA Intertoto Cup. The season covered the period from 1 July 2003 to 30 June 2004.

Transfers

Competitions

Overall record

La Liga

League table

Results summary

Results by round

Matches

Copa del Rey

UEFA Cup

First round

Second round

Third round

Fourth round

Quarter-finals

Semi-finals

UEFA Intertoto Cup

Third round

Semi-finals

Finals

References

Villarreal CF seasons
Villarreal